Dracula: Dead and Loving It is a 1995 gothic comedy horror film directed by Mel Brooks and starring Leslie Nielsen. It is a spoof of Bram Stoker's novel Dracula and of some of the story's well-known adaptations.

Brooks co-authored the screenplay with Steve Haberman and Rudy De Luca. He also appears as Dr. Van Helsing. The film's other stars include Steven Weber, Amy Yasbeck, Peter MacNicol, Harvey Korman, and Anne Bancroft.

The film follows the classic Dracula (1931), starring Bela Lugosi, in its deviations from the novel. Its visual style and production values are reminiscent of the Hammer Horror films. It spoofs, among other films, The Fearless Vampire Killers (1967) and Bram Stoker's Dracula (1992).

, it is the last film to be directed by Mel Brooks, and the second to last co-written by Brooks (he would co-write the screenplay for the 2005 film adaptation of his musical, The Producers).

Plot
In 1893, Solicitor Thomas Renfield travels from London to "Castle Dracula" in Transylvania to finalize Dracula's purchase of Carfax Abbey in England.

Renfield meets Dracula, who unknown to Renfield, is a vampire. Dracula casts a hypnotic spell on Renfield, making him his slave. They soon embark for England. During the voyage, Dracula kills the ship's crew. When the ship arrives and Renfield is discovered alone on the ship, he is confined to a lunatic asylum.

Meanwhile, Dracula visits an opera house, where he introduces himself to his new neighbors; Doctor Seward, the asylum's administrator and head psychiatrist, Seward's daughter, Mina and her fiance, Jonathan Harker and family friend, Lucy Westenra. Dracula flirts with Lucy and later that night, enters her bedroom and drinks her blood.

Mina discovers Lucy still in bed late in the morning, looking strangely pale. Seward, puzzled by the odd puncture marks on her throat, calls in Professor Abraham Van Helsing. Van Helsing informs the skeptical Dr. Seward that Lucy has been attacked by a vampire. Seward and Harker allow garlic to be placed in Lucy's bedroom to repel the vampire, however Seward remains skeptical. After a failed attempt by Renfield to remove the garlic, Dracula uses mind control to get Lucy out of her room and kills her.

Van Helsing meets Dracula and begins to suspect him of being a vampire after the two argue in Moldavian, each attempting to have the last word. Lucy, now a vampire herself, rises from her crypt, drains the blood from her guard, and tries to attack and seduce Harker before he stakes her.

Dracula preys on Mina, wanting her to be his undead bride. Dracula spirits Mina away to Carfax Abbey, where they dance, and he drinks her blood. The following morning, Mina tries to seduce Harker. Dr. Seward assumes Jonathan to be seducing Mina and orders him to leave. Van Helsing notices a scarf around Mina's neck and removes it, revealing two puncture marks. Though she lies about how she got them, Van Helsing confirms she has been attacked by a vampire by placing a cross on her hand, which burns a mark into it.

Van Helsing devises a plan to reveal the vampire's secret identity. Both Dracula and Renfield are invited to a ball, where Van Helsing has placed a huge mirror, covered with a curtain, on one of the walls. While Dracula and Mina perform a dance routine, the curtain over the mirror is dropped, revealing that Dracula has no reflection. Dracula grabs Mina and escapes out of a window.

Van Helsing deduces that Renfield is Dracula's slave, and thus might know where he has taken his coffin after a search of Carfax turns up empty. Dracula locks himself in an abandoned church to finish making Mina his bride. His pursuers break down the door, and fighting ensues. Van Helsing, noticing sunlight creeping into the room, opens the blinds. As his body begins to burn, Dracula then attempts to flee, but is inadvertently killed by Renfield.

With Dracula dead, Renfield falls into despair with no master to serve and scrapes Dracula's ashes into the coffin. Seward tells him "you are free, now" and Renfield seems relieved. Dr. Seward calls for Renfield to follow him out of the church, and he follows, responding "yes, master". Van Helsing opens Dracula's coffin and yells in Moldavian to ensure that he has the final word between himself and the count. After the end credits roll, Dracula responds in Moldavian, giving him the true final word.

Cast

Leslie Nielsen as Count Dracula
Mel Brooks as Professor Van Helsing
Peter MacNicol as Thomas Renfield
Steven Weber as Jonathan Harker
Amy Yasbeck as Mina Seward
Lysette Anthony as Lucy Westenra
Harvey Korman as Dr. Seward
Anne Bancroft as Madame Ouspenskaya (Gypsy Woman)
Ezio Greggio as the coachman
Megan Cavanagh as Essie
Chuck McCann as Innkeeper
Mark Blankfield as Martin
Clive Revill as Sykes
Gregg Binkley as Woodbridge
Rudy De Luca as Guard
Avery Schreiber as Male Peasant on Coach
Cherie Franklin as Female Peasant on Coach
David DeLuise as a student in Van Helsing's demonstration

Production
Principal photography began in May 1995 and wrapped in September 1995. Filming took place from May 8 to July 26, 1995 at Culver Studios, California, United States.

Home media

Soundtrack

A soundtrack titled Dracula: Dead And Loving It was released 1996 on CD by Castle Rock Entertainment.

 "Main Title" (2:20)
 "Faster Horses" (1:07)
 "Too Dark.. / Limping Shadows / The Web / Hypnotizing Reinfield" (1:35)
 ""Vampires?" / Gypsy Woman / Dracula's Castle" (2:21)
 "Reinfield Bleeds / Dracula's Women" (1:55)
 "Striptease / Bat Flies To Window / Dracula Bites Lucy" (2:00)
 "Lucy In Bed / Bite Marks? / 3 Tiny Puncture Marks / I Remember Nothing" / Emergency" (3:01) 
 "Dracula In The Garden / Dracula Files, Reinfield Doesn't! (2:31)
 "Dracula Attacks Lucy / Funeral / Never Give Up!/ To The Crypt / Lucy Bites Sikes / Concern / Jonathan To The Crypt" (3:11)
 "Lucy Reacts To The Cross / Dracula Hypnotizes Mina & Essie" (1:16) 
 "To Carfax Abbey / El Choclo" (2:18)
 "Van Helsing Sees The Mina's Bite" (1:27)
 "The Kaminsky Two-Step" (1:27)
 "Hungarian Dance #5" (3:21)
 "Escape / In Pursuit Of Reinfield / Fight! / Jonathan On The Floor / Attempted Escape" (4:59)
 "Ucipital Mapillary / Romantic Moment / Finale" (3:30)

DVD
 

Blu-ray
 

Reception
Critical reaction to Dracula: Dead and Loving It was overwhelmingly negative, with the film earning a "rotten" rating of only 11% on Rotten Tomatoes based on 36 reviews and an average rating of 3.1/10. The site's consensus states: "Lacking any of the comedic bite that audiences have come to expect from a Mel Brooks farce, this vampire parody just plain ol' sucks." Audiences polled by CinemaScore gave the film an average grade of "C" on an A+ to F scale.

James Berardinelli of ReelViews wrote: "Dracula: Dead and Loving It doesn't come close to the level attained by Young Frankenstein. It's a toothless parody that misses more often than it hits. ... Given the comic turn his career has taken since the early '80s, it's hard to believe that Leslie Nielsen was once a serious actor. These days, thanks to the Zucker brothers ... he has become an accomplished satirical performer. His sense of timing is impeccable, and this asset has made him a sought-after commodity for a wide variety of spoofs. Here, Nielsen takes on the title role, but his presence can't resurrect this stillborn lampoon. Unless you're a die hard Mel Brooks fan, there's no compelling reason to sit through Dracula: Dead and Loving It. The sporadic humor promises some laughs, but the ninety minutes will go by slowly."

Joe Leydon of Variety wrote: "Leslie Nielsen toplines to agreeable effect as Count Dracula, depicted here as a dead-serious but frequently flustered fellow who's prone to slipping on bat droppings in his baroque castle. ... Trouble is, while Dead and Loving It earns a fair share of grins and giggles, it never really cuts loose and goes for the belly laughs. Compared with the recent glut of dumb, dumber and dumbest comedies, Brooks's pic seems positively understated. Indeed, there isn't much here that would have seemed out of place (or too tasteless) in comedy sketches for TV variety shows of the 1950s. ... As a result, unfortunately, Dead and Loving It is so mild, it comes perilously close to blandness. ... The only real sparks are set off by MacNicol as Renfield, the solicitor who develops a taste for flies and spiders after being bitten by Dracula."

Bruce G. Hallenbeck defended the film in his book Comedy-Horror Films: A Chronological History, 1914-2008, saying it "ranks with Polanski's The Fearless Vampire Killers as one of the greatest vampire comedies ever made." He praised the dry wit, strong performances of all the cast members, and the way the film acts as an affectionate homage to the classic vampire films rather than purely a spoof. He attributed the film's negative reception to its being so targeted towards hardcore enthusiasts of vampire films that general audiences would not pick up on most of the jokes, and to the inevitable comparisons to Brooks's seminal Young Frankenstein.

Box office
The film debuted at #10. By the end of its run, Dracula grossed $10,772,144.

See also

 Vampire film
 Vampire in Brooklyn''

References

External links

 Official website
 
 
 

Dracula films
1995 films
1990s comedy horror films
American comedy horror films
American parody films
American satirical films
American vampire films
French comedy horror films
English-language French films
French parody films
French vampire films
1990s German-language films
Films directed by Mel Brooks
Films produced by Mel Brooks
Films with screenplays by Mel Brooks
Films set in 1893
Films set in London
Films set in Transylvania
Films set in castles
Films shot in California
Brooksfilms films
Castle Rock Entertainment films
Columbia Pictures films
PolyGram Filmed Entertainment films
Films scored by Hummie Mann
Vampire comedy films
American slapstick comedy films
Parodies of horror
Films about hypnosis
French satirical films
Films with screenplays by Rudy De Luca
1990s English-language films
1990s American films
1990s French films